Anderson Lee Pryor (born July 14, 1900) was a Negro leagues second baseman during the first Negro National League.

He played most of his seasons for the Detroit Stars.

References

External links
 and Baseball-Reference Black Baseball stats and Seamheads

Negro league baseball managers
Detroit Stars players
Indianapolis ABCs (1931–1933) players
Milwaukee Bears players
1900 births
20th-century deaths
Year of death missing
20th-century African-American sportspeople